The 1993–94 season was Stoke City's 87th season in the Football League and 31st in the second tier, now known as the First Division following the formation of the Premier League.

Stoke, now back in the second tier for the first time since 1990, were now looking to gain promotion back to English football's top tier and with Lou Macari in charge it seemed to be a real possibility. Icelandic international Toddy Örlygsson arrived from Nottingham Forest which signalled the club's intentions but they were rocked in October when manager Macari decided to join boyhood club Celtic and another Scotsman, Joe Jordan was appointed manager. Unlike Macari, Jordan was not a popular person with the supporters due to his lack of passion and style of play. Results were okay and a 10th-place finish was the final outcome.

Season review

League
In the summer of 1993 brewer Carling was signed up as the new shirt sponsor and in the build-up to the 1993–94 season Macari sought out to strengthen his squad in readiness for a tough looking First Division. In came Icelandic international midfielder Toddy Örlygsson and proven goalscorer Gary Bannister both from Nottingham Forest, Simon Sturridge from Birmingham City, goalkeeper Mark Prudhoe from Darlington and Martin Carruthers from Aston Villa, whilst Micky Gynn and Kenny Lowe arrived on free transfers. Goalkeeper Carl Muggleton came in from Leicester City and Kevin Russell joined Burnley for £120,000.

A good crowd of 18,766 attended the opening match of the season as Stoke fell to a poor 2–1 defeat to Millwall and questions were asked about the quality of Macari's players in the much tougher First Division. And with Stoke failing to find any real form despite a fantastic victory against Manchester United in the League Cup the fans were shocked when star striker Mark Stein, who by October had already scored 13 goals, was allowed to join Chelsea for a club record fee of £1.4 million. Stein had become an idol amongst the supporters and felt let down by the board for accepting Chelsea's offer. Come November and Stoke were struggling in the bottom half of the table and soon after manager Lou Macari left for one of his former club's, Celtic. The new manager was another former Scottish international with a similar career to that of Macari, Joe Jordan. Stoke supporters felt that the appointment of Jordan was the wrong decision with club legend Denis Smith the preferred man to take the position.

They eventually accepted Jordan as the new manager although his style of play soon began to cause grumblings from the terraces but the side slowly got results going if not the quality of football. In early 1994 the club was rocked by news that former manager Tony Waddington had died and thousands of supporters lined the streets on the day of his funeral to pay their respects to Stoke's most successful manager. Stoke huffed and puffed as they tried to claim a play-off place but missed out and finished an eventful season in 10th place.

FA Cup
After overcoming plucky non-league Bath City in a third round replay, 4–1 at Twerton Park, Stoke lost to Premiership side Oldham Athletic.

League Cup
Stoke knocked out Mansfield Town which set up a clash with Manchester United. Stoke produced a fantastic first leg performance and won 2–1 thanks to two goals from Stein, but they could not repeat the feat in the second leg and lost 2–0.

Final league table

Results

Legend

Football League First Division

FA Cup

League Cup

Anglo-Italian Cup

Friendlies

Squad statistics

References

Stoke City F.C. seasons
Stoke City F.C.